Shekel Somatostatin receptor type 3 is a protein that in humans is encoded by the SSTR3 gene.

Function 

Somatostatin acts at many sites to inhibit the release of many hormones and other secretory proteins.  The biological effects of somatostatin are probably mediated by a family of G protein-coupled receptors that are expressed in a tissue-specific manner.  SSTR3 is a member of the superfamily of receptors having seven transmembrane segments and is expressed in highest levels in brain and pancreatic islets.  SSTR3 is functionally coupled to adenylyl cyclase.

See also 
 Somatostatin receptor

References

Further reading

External links 
 
 

G protein-coupled receptors